Baar may refer to:

Places
 Baar, Switzerland, a municipality in the Canton of Zug, Switzerland
 Baar, Swabia, a town in western Bavaria, Germany
 Baar, Rhineland-Palatinate, a municipality in Rhineland-Palatinate, Germany
 Baar (region), a region in southern Germany, between the Black Forest and the Swabian Alb
 Baar-Ebenhausen, a municipality in central Bavaria

People 
 Baar (surname)
 Count of Baar, Germany
 Fürstenberg-Baar

Television
 Baar (TV series), an Estonian reality television program, based on The Bar Swedish reality competition television franchise

See also 
 Bahr (disambiguation)
 Barr (disambiguation)